Salwan is a village of high historical interest and biggest village in Karnal District and one of the  biggest villages in Haryana.                     

The village belongs to Zamindar Brahmins's. The pride of this village is Bollywood Actor Vikas Bhardwaj.

Village has contributed a lot to INDIAN ARMY. Recently, 11th lieutenant was welcomed with a celebration in the village. It has given Hundreds of its son for serving the country.           

It contains a tirtha identified as having national importance.Salwan village in Karnal district shot into the limelight when an ancient pond with a temple was discovered to be the sacred Dashashwamedha Tirtha of the Mahabharat period. This holy tirtha has been mentioned in detail in the Vamana Purana and, like most of the divine shrines around Kurukshetra region was revered by the Pancha Pandavas and Lord Krishna.

The pond however appears to have been renovated and added to a temple complex somewhere during the 18th – 19th century by either the Marathas or Maharaja Gajpat Singh of Jind. At present, one can see the pond and temple that were probably the original structures quite close to each other along with another temple and yagnashala that have been built much later. 

The original temple is built as a pancharatha in the typical early Nagara style of architecture. The inner walls of both temples are richly decorated with frescos dating back to the late 19th century. No inscription has been found yet in this complex. 

Unfortunately, all remnants of the Mahabharat period within the ancient pond have either been stolen or have not withstood the ravages of the weather and time. This ancient pond and temple are protected by the Archaeological Survey of India (ASI).   

The tirth itself is deemed to be sacrosanct and of immense spiritual and religious potency. People from far-flung places come to pray at this tirth. . 

Many famous rajputs are native to this village. The village has a great brotherhood with other villages.

References

Villages in Karnal district